The Saint Francis of Assisi College Calamba (SFAC-Calamba historically, "SFACS-Calamba") is one of the campuses of the Saint Francis of Assisi College System, a multi-campus, non-sectarian but Catholic Oriented, private institution of learning. The system is a sister school of the Seattle Central Community College, Time Magazine's Community college of 2001.

The school is also one of the three campuses of the system in the Province of Laguna, the other two being in Los Baños and Biñan. The Calamba campus is situated at Milan Street, Calamba Hills Village Phase II, Barandal, Calamba, Philippines. The Patron saint of the school is its namesake, Francis of Assisi.

History 
Saint Francis of Assisi College System was founded in 1981 by Mr. and Mrs. Evangeline Orosco in Las Piñas. Since then, it has grown into a network of campuses in and around Metro Manila. SFACS-Calamba was established in 1991, a decade after the Las Piñas campus was opened. The campus is currently headed by the Directress-Principal, Mrs. Evelyn O. Oliveros. In 1996, the school inaugurated the Saint Francis of Assisi Building, a four-storey facility that houses classrooms, a cafeteria, computer room, the learning resource center, a speech lab, gymnasium and the offices of the administration and finance. The school will celebrate its 20th Anniversary during academic year 2011–2012.

Culture, sports and tradition
Franciscans are known for their performance arts. The school has won awards for song and dance in local competitions and its dance troupe, Tribong Fransiskano was the only school dance group featured in the final season of the Digital LG Challenge.

Every year, the school celebrates its Foundation Day on the Feast Day of Saint Francis of Assisi, October 4. It is usually a week-long event highlighted by an evening programme.

Other annual celebrations include the Living Rosary, Recognition Day and Faculty Day. Mass is held every first Wednesday of every month of the school year, and a Baccalaureate Mass is celebrated preceding the Recognition and Graduation Ceremonies. In 2002, SFACS-Calamba showed one of its largest productions in terms of participating students and costs based on several Disney animation classics. Students went through weeks of workshops during otherwise vacant hours, and the school renovated parts of the gymnasium, rented and acquired various lighting and audio equipment. This was replicated by another, smaller scale production by the school in 2005 to celebrate the Christmas holiday.

The school is involved in outreach programs to help the less fortunate in the school's community. In 2004, the graduating senior students of the school initiated an outreach program to the pre-school students of the Barandal Elementary School.

Organizations
 Student Body Organization - consists of student-elected officials that oversee projects for the school.
 Franciscan Young Communicators Organization - official organization for the communication arts. Organizes Language Week.
 Franciscan Young Scientists and Mathematicians Organization - official organization for the natural, physical, technological and mathematical sciences. Organizes the Science Camp.
 Franciscan Young Sociologists Organization - official organization for the social sciences.
 Tribong Fransiskano - official dance troupe
 Franciscan Herald - official newspaper
 SF Club Philippines - promotes the interests and extra-curricular education of its members.

Curriculum and course offerings 

SFACS-Calamba offers courses in Pre-School, Elementary and High School. The school also has a Home Study Program for students who are not able to attend normal classes. During summer, it offers free workshops that range from cooking classes to sports clinics, specifically basketball and badminton. The school is recognized by the Department of Education, it uses an approved education curricula. Computer and speech education is offered in all levels.
Pre-School
 Nursery
 Kinder 1
 Kinder 2
Elementary
 Basic (grades 1–3)
 Intermediate (grades 4–6)
High School
 grades 7-10

Catholic elementary schools in the Philippines
Catholic secondary schools in the Philippines
Universities and colleges in Laguna (province)
Education in Calamba, Laguna